José Tria Fuentebella (June 17, 1883 – July 25, 1982), widely known as "Pepe", was a Filipino politician. He is the first Fuentebella to foray into the national arena of politics.

Early life and education
Fuentebella studied at Colegio de San Buenaventura in Albay. He finished his Bachelor of Arts in Ateneo de Manila in 1902, obtained his Bachelor of Laws from Escuela de Leyes in 1905 and passed the bar in 1906. José practiced law for three years before entering politics at the age of 26.

Political and Professional Career
He was elected representative of Ambos Camarines's 3rd district for the Second Philippine Legislature in 1909. He also served in the Third Philippine Legislature until 1916.

He convinced his father, Mariano Fuentebella, to run for governor of Ambos Camarines in 1912. Together they formed a powerful tandem and were able to obtain benefits for the province from the colonial government. When his father died, although he was in a higher office as a representative, José accepted the appointment as governor to finish his father's term and implement their joint projects.

In 1916, he returned to private practice. But in 1931, he made his return to the Senate as a 6th district senator in 1928 and served two terms (1928-1931 and 1931-1934).

The Senate was abolished in 1935. In the legislative polls later that year, Fuentebella won a seat in the unicameral National Assembly and served two terms until 1941.

Although the Senate was restored in 1941, Fuentebella ran for a seat in the Lower House in the November polls. However, the 1st Congress of the Commonwealth of the Philippines did not seat until 1945 as World War II came to the Philippines.

During the Japanese Occupation, from September 1943 to December 1944, Fuentebella was appointed Commissioner of the 5th Military District comprising the entire Bicol Region. After consulting guerilla leaders, he accepted the appointment from the Laurel government reluctantly and only to prevent more Japanese atrocities.

After the war, he finished his term as representative and successfully defended himself from accusations that he had collaborated with the Japanese.

Fuentebella was appointed Philippine Ambassador to Indonesia by then Philippine President Ramon Magsaysay. He exercised deft democracy from 1955 to 1961, a crucial time in Philippine and Indonesian relations. Subsequently, Philippine President Ferdinand E. Marcos appointed him Presidential Adviser on Foreign Affairs.

Fuentebella was an ardent nationalist and founder of the Nacionalista Party in Bicol. He is one who espoused the "Filipino First" policy of then Philippine President Carlos Garcia. One of his greatest achievements as a politician was the extension of the Philippine National Railways to Bicol, establishing Camarines Sur Polytechnic Colleges in Naga City, and being the author of the "Flag Law".

Death
He died on July 25, 1982.

Legacy
The Governor Jose T. Fuentebella National Highway was named after him through Republic Act No. 7786 in August 8, 1994.

References

 Building Institutions: The Fuentebella Legacy by Coylee Gamboa

1982 deaths
1883 births
Governors of Camarines Norte
Governors of Camarines Sur
Members of the House of Representatives of the Philippines from Camarines Sur
Senators of the 9th Philippine Legislature
Filipino diplomats
KALIBAPI politicians
Nacionalista Party politicians
People from Camarines Sur
Advisers to the President of the Philippines
Ferdinand Marcos administration personnel
Jose
Ateneo de Manila University alumni
Members of the Philippine Legislature
Members of the National Assembly of the Philippines
Members of the National Assembly (Second Philippine Republic)
Senators of the 8th Philippine Legislature